Kakinada Port railway station (station code:COA) is an Indian Railways station in Kakinada of East Godavari district in the Indian state of Andhra Pradesh. It lies on the Samalkot–Kakinada Port branch line, a branch line of Howrah–Chennai main line and is administered under Vijayawada railway division of South Coast Railway zone (formerly South Central Railway zone).

History 
Old port station was being used for goods & other transport activities.

Classification 
In terms of earnings and outward passengers handled, Kakinada Port is categorized as a Non-Suburban Grade-4 (NSG-4) railway station. Based on the re–categorization of Indian Railway stations for the period of 2017–18 and 2022–23, an NSG–4 category station earns between – crore and handles  passengers.

Originating express trains 
Also see - Trains originating from Kakinada Town

Station amenities 

It is one of the 38 stations in the division to be equipped with Automatic Ticket Vending Machines (ATVMs).

References

External links 
Trains at Kakinada Port railway station

Railway stations in East Godavari district
Vijayawada railway division
Railway stations in India opened in 2011
Transport in Kakinada
2011 establishments in Andhra Pradesh
Railway terminus in India